Perlilla is a mountain of 5587 m in the Cordillera Blanca range, a part of the Peruvian Andes. It lies within the provinces of Asunción, Carhuaz and Huari. Its eastern summit (5,587) is located in the Huari Province.

The peak was climbed for the first time on July 14, 1966 by M. Ishinabe, A. Kurihara, A. Miyahara, S. Ooe and T. Suzuki).

Features 
Perlilla has an area a bit greater than 30 km², 90% of its surface is accessible without much difficulty from the town of Chacas. The 14 km² of snow surface at its northern part are suitable for the practice of winter sports because the slopes do not exceed 50°.

Due to its latitude (9 ° 18'16 "S) so close to the equator, could be considered the ski center at higher altitudes closer to Ecuador, surpassing the Chacaltaya Bolivian track for its vast area of 3000 snowfall hectares and its enormous potential for the development of winter sports.

The beauty of its surroundings comprises the following natural attractions:

 Yanaqucha
 Paqarisha Lake
 Ventanilla Lake
 Quebrada Honda
 Quebrada Ashnuwana
 Juytush River

Gallery

See also 
 Copap

References 

Mountains of Peru
Mountains of Ancash Region
Glaciers of Ancash Region